Sotteville may refer to one of several municipalities in the Normandy region of France:

Sotteville, Manche
Sotteville-lès-Rouen
Sotteville-sous-le-Val
Sotteville-sur-Mer